Menominee is a village in Jo Daviess County, Illinois, United States. The population was 248 at the 2010 census, up from 237 in 2000. The village is located on the Little Menominee River near East Dubuque and Galena.

The village derives its name from the Menominee indigenous peoples.

Geography
Menominee is located at  (42.474652, -90.542114).

Demographics

As of the census of 2000, there were 237 people, 78 households, and 59 families residing in the village. Also according to the census of 2000 there were over 800 cows located in Menominee, almost four times the population. The racial makeup of the village was 97.89% White, 0.84% African American, 0.84% from other races, and 0.42% from two or more races. Hispanic or Latino of any race were 4.22% of the population.

There were 78 households, out of which 35.9% had children under the age of 18 living with them, 65.4% were married couples living together, 7.7% had a female householder with no husband present, and 23.1% were non-families. 19.2% of all households were made up of individuals, and 5.1% had someone living alone who was 65 years of age or older.  The average household size was 3.04 and the average family size was 3.53.

In the village, the population was spread out, with 33.8% under the age of 18, 6.8% from 18 to 24, 28.3% from 25 to 44, 21.5% from 45 to 64, and 9.7% who were 65 years of age or older.  The median age was 35 years. For every 100 females, there were 111.6 males.  For every 100 females age 18 and over, there were 106.6 males.

The median income for a household in the village was $45,972, and the median income for a family was $47,500. Males had a median income of $33,036 versus $20,000 for females. The per capita income for the village was $14,518.  About 6.7% of families and 18.2% of the population were below the poverty line, including 30.6% of those under the age of eighteen and 3.8% of those 65 or over.

References

External links
Jo Daviess County

Villages in Jo Daviess County, Illinois
Villages in Illinois